The 1983 Kwara State gubernatorial election occurred on August 13, 1983. UPN candidate Cornelius Adebayo won the election.

Results
Cornelius Adebayo representing UPN won the election. The election held on August 13, 1983.

References 

Kwara State gubernatorial elections
Kwara State gubernatorial election
Kwara State gubernatorial election